Andijan State University named after Z.M.Bobur (often abbreviated as ASU or ADU) is a university in Andijan, eastern Uzbekistan. It was founded in 1939 as a branch of Fergana Pedagogical Institute. Today, 6905 undergraduate students and 149 postgraduate students are enrolled at the University. According to the information provided by the Ministry of Higher and Secondary Specialized Education of the Republic of Uzbekistan there are 31 Professors, 151 PhD, 144 assistant professors and 198 assistant teachers.

Faculties 
University faculties
 Physics-Mathematics
 Philology
 History 
 Natural and Geography
 Foreign Languages
 Physical Education
 Pedagogy
 Primary Education Methodology
 Social and Economic Sciences

Overview

ASU has 31 academic departments and 25 fields for undergraduate, 13 fields for postgraduate (Master). Nowadays, highly specialized professors, and associate professors are doing researches on a range of fields.

References

External links

Universities in Uzbekistan
Andijan